Joshua Heuston (born 18 November 1996) is an Australian actor and model. He is best known for his roles in the Australian television series Dive Club (2021), More Than This, Heartbreak High and Bali 2002 (all three 2022); as well as for his work in modelling.

Early life and education
Heuston was born and raised in Sydney, and is of Anglo-Sri Lankan descent.

Career

Modelling
Heuston was working as a bartender during first year at university when he was scouted to be a model. After some thought, he explored photography and style then started seriously posting to Instagram and YouTube where he quickly became a sought after content creator. Heuston has worked on campaigns for major brands such as Fendi, Gucci, Louis Vuitton, David Jones and Burberry among many others. He was invited to sit in the front row of the Milan and Shanghai catwalk for Tommynow Drive by Tommy Hilfiger and did a meet and greet for the brand in Sydney.

In 2018, he made his Mercedes Benz Fashion Week Australia debut walking for the brand 'Justin Cassin'.

In 2020, Heuston was part of a campaign for Bumble in Australia where his dating profile was featured and encouraged "virtual dating" during the pandemic.

Acting
Heuston stated that he was betrayed by his own shyness and never pursued drama while at school. After featuring in the music video for Super Cruel's song "Sicklaced" with Cartia Mallan in 2017, Heuston fell in love with acting and started classes.

Heuston's screen acting debut came in the Network 10 teen thriller series Dive Club, starring alongside Miah Maddern and Georgia-May Davis, which aired on Network 10 in Australia followed by an international Netflix release. The series is set in the fictional seaside town of Cape Mercy and focuses on a group of school girl ocean divers. Heuston plays the part of Henry, the towns resident sad boy with a heart of gold. The series was filmed on the Great Barrier Reef in Port Douglas, Queensland.

Heuston had a small non-speaking role in Thor: Love and Thunder as a Zeus Pretty Boy. He plays Dusty in Heartbreak High (2022present), a Netflix reboot of the 1990s series of the same name. In December 2022, it was announced that Heuston has been cast as Constantine Corrino in the upcoming Dune prequel television series, Dune: The Sisterhood.

Filmography 
Dive Club (2021) as Henry
More Than This (2022) as Sammy
Thor: Love and Thunder (2022) as Zeus Pretty Boy
Heartbreak High (2022present) as Dusty Reid
Bali 2002 (2022) as Luke Beasley
Finally Me (2022) as Barry
Dune: The Sisterhood (TBA) as Constantine Corrino

Notes

References

External links

Living people
1996 births
21st-century Australian male actors
Australian male television actors
Australian male models
Australian people of English descent
Australian people of Sri Lankan descent
Macquarie University alumni